Lubanki, also known as Labanki, is an extinct Indo-Aryan language formerly spoken by the Labana tribe in the Punjab. It was a dialect of Labanas, being a mixture of Marwari, Saraiki, Gujarati and Marathi. The dialect is extinct among Labanas of Punjab, but Rajasthani Labanas still speak it. 

Among Sikhs, the famous Labanki quote Guru Ladho Re(Found the Guru) was outspoken when Makhan Shah identify the 9th successor of Nanak, Guru Tegh Bahadur.

External links
 https://web.archive.org/web/20080908091840/http://www.labana.org/world/index.php

Punjabi dialects
Labana